David Beresford Pratt (1 October 1908 – 1 October 1961) was a South African businessman and anti-apartheid activist who shot South African Prime Minister Hendrik Verwoerd in 1960. Verwoerd survived, but was killed six years later by Dimitri Tsafendas.

Life
Pratt was a farmer and wealthy businessman of British descent. He studied at Gonville and Caius College University of Cambridge, England, where he studied Economics (part I) and Law (part II), graduating in 1931 with a third class honours degree. Pratt was deeply upset by  the racial injustices of apartheid in South Africa. He was concerned with poverty among black South Africans and built a school and houses on his farm for black workers and their children. Pratt was a member of the South African and British Liberal parties and was active in the British anti-apartheid movement. At meetings of the Liberal Party of South Africa he spoke openly against apartheid.

He suffered from epilepsy from an early age and evidence suggests that he was a loner at school. Pratt was married twice. There is evidence that he suffered from his first serious bout of depression in 1946 after his divorce from Mary Hatrick. His second marriage was to Patty van Heijningen.

In 1954, shortly after the birth of their first child, Pratt claimed to have received a message which he should convey to South Africa. He was boarded and diagnosed as suffering from “grandiose delusions of the political saviour type”. Pratt was almost constantly in psychiatric treatment. His Dutch wife feared for her safety because he threatened her. In the beginning of 1958 she left him and returned to The Hague, taking their two children with her. He followed her with a gun in his pocket but was apprehended at Amsterdam Airport. His condition worsened and he became manic. His neurologist, Dr Chesler, urged his sister to have a curator bonis (legal guardian) appointed for him because he could no longer manage his affairs properly. He desperately tried to win his wife back. When that failed, he attempted to kidnap his little daughter during a ski holiday. As he became more desperate about his marital problems, Pratt tried to commit suicide on three occasions. It appears that Pratt’s paranoid condition was reinforced by the escalation of the political conflict after the Sharpeville massacre.

Assassination attempt

On 9 April 1960, Pratt shot South African Prime Minister Hendrik Verwoerd twice, at point blank range, with a .22 pistol. Verwoerd, who had been opening the Union Exposition in Milner Park, Johannesburg, was rushed to hospital, and within two months had made a complete recovery. Pratt was arrested at the scene and taken to the Marshall Square police station, and then to the Forensic Medical Laboratory. He appeared for a preliminary hearing in the Johannesburg Magistrates' Court on 20 and 21 July 1960, once it was clear that the Verwoerd's injuries were not fatal.

Pratt claimed he had been shooting 'the epitome of apartheid'. The court accepted the medical reports submitted to it by five psychiatrists, all of which confirmed that Pratt lacked legal capacity and could not be held criminally liable for having shot the prime minister. On 26 September 1960, he was committed to a mental hospital in Bloemfontein. 

Before and after Pratt's court hearing, friends stated that he was perfectly sane. His defence team believed the only way to ensure a lighter punishment was to plead insanity. In his court hearing Pratt declared: "South Africa has to throw off the slimy snake apartheid which is gripping its throat."

Death
Pratt died on 1 October 1961, his fifty-third birthday, and shortly before his parole was to be considered. Pratt's cause of death was asphyxiation and was ruled as a suicide. No inquest was held into his death. Doubts still remain about the circumstances of Pratt's demise as many suicides during apartheid were later proven to be murders by the police or security forces.

References

Citations

Sources

1908 births
1961 deaths
Failed assassins
South African assassins
20th-century South African businesspeople
South African people who died in prison custody
South African expatriates in the United Kingdom
Alumni of Gonville and Caius College, Cambridge
Prisoners who died in South African detention
People who committed suicide in prison custody
Suicides by hanging in South Africa